Fowlerichthys radiosus, the singlespot frogfish, is a species of frogfish found in the Atlantic Ocean.  This species grows to a length of  TL.

References
Theodore W. Pietsch, The Genera of Frogfishes (Family Antennariidae), Copeia, Vol. 1984, No. 1 (Feb. 23, 1984), pp. 27–44.
 

Antennariidae
Fish described in 1896